A Section Patrol Craft was a civilian vessel registered by the United States Navy for potential wartime service before, during, and shortly after World War I.

Historical overview

The SP/ID registration system
In 1916, with World War I raging abroad, the U.S. Navy began a registry of privately owned pleasure craft and yachts that were available for patrol service in the event the United States was drawn into the conflict, which it eventually entered on 6 April 1917. Naval Registry Identification Numbers were assigned in a "Section Patrol" series beginning with SP-1 and ultimately extending to well over 4000.

As the registration process continued, other types of ships and craft (such as cargo ships, tankers, and passenger ships) were included which were not suited or intended for patrol duty and for which the "Section Patrol" designation was clearly inappropriate, and these were generally given "Identification" ("ID") numbers in the same series as the "SP" numbers. In addition, some vessels that were numbered with an "SP" prefix before 1918 later had that prefix changed to "ID". Many of the ships and craft assigned SP or ID numbers had no Navy service, while others that were acquired and employed by the Navy received no numbers.

The registry, and the SP/ID number series, was continued at least into the early 1920s, with new numbers being assigned to ships completed or examined after World War I ended on 11 November 1918. The latter category included some ships that served in the Navy without SP or ID numbers between 1917 and 1919.

SP/ID numbers and U.S. Navy hull numbers
The SP and ID registry numbers were not U.S. Navy "hull numbers," which would not be formally adopted until 17 July 1920. However, like hull numbers, the SP and ID numbers were used for record-keeping purposes and were often painted on the exterior of vessels (especially patrol types) to facilitate identification. They can therefore be considered precursors of the U.S. Navy hull number system instituted in July 1920 and still in use today. At least 67 vessels with ID / SP numbers were later given modern hull symbols, with a few (at least 7) retaining their ID or SP numbers under the new system.

World War I section patrol (SP) and identification number (ID) series
Incomplete listing of civilian boats and ships commissioned during World War I for use as section patrol (SP) craft and civilian cargo ships, tankers, transports, etc., commissioned for U.S. Navy use during World War and given non-"SP" identification numbers (ID) in the "SP" numbering series.

Identification numbers (ID)

Many of these ships would be later sunk during World War II while in commercial service. Two would be deliberately sunk as Mulberry harbor breakwaters during the invasion of Normandy. Only sinkings while in US Navy service with an ID number are listed.

 , sank in storm 26 February 1918, 32 killed
 , later YP-506
 , later YFB-1227
 
 , later CM-4
 , later CM-3
 
 
 
 
 
 , aka ID-1350
 
 
 
 
 
 , torpedoed 16 September 1918, no fatalities
 
 , aka ID-1315
 
 
 
 
 
 , ex-SP-1385, later IX-45
 
 , torpedoed 1 July 1918 by U-86, sank 2 July, 6 killed
 
 
 
 
 
 
 
 
 
 
 , later IX-142
 , later AP-24
 
 
 
 
 , later AO-46
 
 
 
 
 
 
 
 USS Atik (ID-1608), not commissioned
 
 
 
 
 
 
 
 USS Edward Luckenbach (ID-1662)
 
 
 , later IX-106
 , minelayer
 , minelayer
 , minelayer
 , minelayer
 , minelayer
 , minelayer
 
 
 
 
 
 
 
 
 , later AG-45
 
 , later AF-6
 
 
 
 
 
 
 , later AK-8
 
 , later YFB-2047
 
 
 
 
 
 , later AK-9
 , later AD-9
 USS Hatteras (ID-2142)
 
 
 
 
 
 
 
 
 
 
 
 
 
 
 
 
 , later AK-100
 
 
 
 , later AS-5
 , sank 9 November 1918 after mine strike, no fatalities
 
 
 
 
 
 
 
 
 
 
 
 
 
 
 
 
 
 
 
 
 
 
 
 
 
 
 
 
 
 
 
 
 
 
 
 
 
 
 
 
 
 
 
 
 
 
 
 
 
 
 , sank in collision 12 May 1918, no fatalities
 
 
 
 
 
 
 
 , torpedoed 11 July 1918, 11 killed
 , later AP-36
 
 
 
 
 
 
 
 
 , later AG-46
 
 
 
 
 
 
 
 
 
 
 , later AK-6
 , later AR-2
 
 , later AP-29
 
 , later AP-33
 , later AS-8
 
 , later AP-19
 
 
 
 
 
 
 
 
 
 , later YT-28
 , later AK-22, AO-14, AG-27
 
 
 
 
 
 
 
 
 
 , later AS-6
 
 
 , later AO-8
 
 
 
 
 
 
 
 
 
 
 , sank in collision 7 October 1918, 7 killed
 
 
 
 
 
 
 
 
 , later YFB-3268
 
 
 
 
 
 
 
 
 
 
 
 
 
 
 
 
 
 
 
 
 
 
 
 
 
 
 , later AK-35
 , later AG-42
 
 
 
 
 
 , later AP-13
 
 
 
 
 
 
 
 
 
 , later AG-36
 
 
 
 
 
 
 
 
 , later AK-33
 , later AF-18
 
 
 
 
 
 , later AK-38
 
 
 
 
 
 
 
 
 
 
 
 
 
 
 , later AP-28
 , later AF-7
 
 
 
 
 
 
 
 
 
 
 
 
 
 
 
 
 
 
 
 
 
 
 
 
 
 
 
 , later AG-37
 
 
 
 
 , later IX-33
 
 
 
 
 
 , later AK-34
 
 
 
 
 , later AF-16

Section patrol (SP)

 
 
 
 
 
 
 
 
 
 
 , destroyed in fire 20 June 1917 while fitting out
 
 
 
 
 
 
 
 , destroyed in collision 19 October 1918
 
 
 
 
 
 , later PC-454, PYc-46
 
 
 
 
 
 
 , sunk in collision 28 October 1918
 
 
 
 
 
 
 , later PY-9
 
 
 
 
 
 , later AGS-3
 
 
 
 , wrecked 28 February 1920
 , torpedoed 5 November 1917, 21 killed
 
 
 
 
 , later YP-179
 
 
 
 
 
 
 , later PYc-25
 
 
 
 
 
 
 
 
 
 
 
 
 
 
 , later YP-214
 
 
 
 , wrecked 9–10 September 1919
 
 
 
 
 
 
 
 , assigned to Thomas Edison for antisubmarine research
 
 
 
 
 
 
 
 
 
 
 
 
 
 
 
 
 
 
 
 
 
 
 
 
 
 
 , wrecked 12 January 1918
 
 , foundered 4 October 1917
 
 , wrecked 21 August 1918, 7 killed
 , sunk in collision 5 October 1918, no fatalities
 
 
 
 
 
 , later PY-7 
 
 , sank after internal explosion 21 August 1917, no fatalities
 
 
 
 , foundered 28 April 1919, no fatalities
 , wrecked 28 April 1919, 15 killed
 
 
 
 
 
 
 
 
 
 
 
 
 , wrecked 9 September 1919
 
 
 
 USS Machigonne (SP-507)
 
 
 , wrecked 26 January 1918, no fatalities
 
 
 
 
 , later PY-10
 
 
 
 
 
 
 
 
 
 
 , sunk in collision 26 November 1918
 
 , later PY-15
 
 
 
 , foundered 4 November 1917
 
 
 , later PY-26
 
 
 
 
 
 
 
 
 
 
 
 
 , later PY-6
 
 , wrecked 7 July 1917
 
 
 
 
 , later YP-200
 
 
 
 
 
 
 
 
 
 
 
 
 
 
 
 
 
 
 
 
 
 , wrecked 21 February 1918, no fatalities
 
 
 
 
 
 
 
 , wrecked 8 December 1917, no fatalities
 , later YP-714
 
 
 
 
 
 
 
 
 
 
 
 
 
 
 
 
 , later YT-33
 
 
 
 
 
 
 
 
 
 
 
 
 
 
 
 , later AT-56
 

 
 
 
 
 , burned and sank 27 December 1918
 
 
 
 , burned July 1918
 
 
 
 
 
 
 
 
 
 , later YT-42, YTB-42
 
 
 
 

 

 
 , later AT-57
 , later AT-59, YT-126, YTM-126

 , damaged beyond repair 6 November 1918 while being loaded on board the oiler USS Kanawha
 
 
 
 

 

 

 

 
 
 
 
 
 
 
 
 , later AT-55, scuttled 5 May 1942 at Corregidor
 , later AT-54, disappeared June 1921, 56 killed
 , foundered 26 February 1918, no fatalities
 
 
 
 
 
 
 
 
 , burned and sank 21 October 1918, no fatalities
 
 
 
 
 
 
 
 
 
 
 
 
 
 
 
 
 
 
  
 
 
 
 
 
 
 , later YT-30
 
 
 
 
 
 
 
 
 
 
 
 
 
 SP-1385, later ID-1385
 
 
 
 
 
 USS Swan (SP-1437) (Not used)
 
 
 
 
 
 
 
 
 
 
 
 
 
 
 
 
 
 
 
 
 
 
 
 

 
 
 
 
 
 
 
 
 
 
 
 
 , unaccounted for abroad
 
 
 
 
 
 
 
 
 
 
 
 
 
 
 
 
 
 
 , sank under tow 7 October 1921
 
 
 
 
 
 
 
 
 
 
 
 
 
 
 
 
 
 
 
 
 
 
 
 
 
 
 
 
 , later YT-31
 
 
 
 
 
 
 
 
 
 
 
 , later AK-5
 
 
 
 
 
 
 
 
 
 
 
 
 
 
 
 
 
 
 
 
 
 
 
 
 
 
 
 
 
 
 
 
 
 
 
 
 
 
 
 
 
 
 
 
 
 
 
 
 
 
 
 , later AP-16, APA-9

References

World War I patrol vessels of the United States